Trausdorf Airport  was a public use airstrip located 1 km south of Trausdorf an der Wulka, Burgenland, Austria.

See also
List of airports in Austria

References

External links
 Airport record for Trausdorf Airport at Landings.com

Airports in Austria
Burgenland